D. carvalhoi may refer to:
 Dendrophryniscus carvalhoi, a toad species endemic to Brazil
 Diplopterys carvalhoi, a plant species in the genus Diplopterys

See also
 Carvalhoi (disambiguation)